Fakta homma is a Finnish comedy television series. It first aired on Finnish TV in 1986 and last aired in 1998.

Cast

Main characters
 Eija Vilpas – Pirjo Kaasinen (1986–1998)
 Riitta Havukainen – Hannele Kaakko (1986–1998)
 Lasse Karkjärvi – Heikki Kaasinen (1986–1998)
 Taneli Mäkelä – Aulis Kaakko (1986–1998)

Other people 
 Mikko Kivinen – Automotive distributor; Reima Helenius
 Jukka Puotila –  Hairdresser
 Martti Suosalo –  a neighbor,  Asko
 Timo Torikka - furniture store salesperson
 Ville Virtanen – policeman and doorman

See also
List of Finnish television series

External links
 

Finnish television shows
1986 Finnish television series debuts
1998 Finnish television series endings
Yle original programming